Anders Olof Antonius "Olle" Andersson (29 December 1895 – 6 May 1974) was a Swedish tennis player. He competed in the men's doubles at the 1920 Summer Olympics, together with Henning Müller, and finished in ninth place.

References

1895 births
1974 deaths
Swedish male tennis players
Olympic tennis players of Sweden
Tennis players at the 1920 Summer Olympics
People from Gävle
Sportspeople from Gävleborg County